William Bird Brodie (26 September 1780 – 24 October 1863) was a British Whig politician.

Brodie was the son of Reverend Peter Bellinger Brodie and Sarah née Collins. In 1810, he married Louisa Hussey, daughter of Thomas Hussey. After her death in 1816, he married Frances Huntley, daughter of Reverend Richard Huntley, in 1826.

Brodie was elected Whig Member of Parliament for Salisbury at the 1832 general election and held the seat until 1843 when he resigned the seat by accepting the office of Steward of the Chiltern Hundreds.

References

External links
 

UK MPs 1832–1835
UK MPs 1835–1837
UK MPs 1837–1841
UK MPs 1841–1847
Whig (British political party) MPs for English constituencies
1780 births
1863 deaths